Los Amigos High School, located in Fountain Valley, California, is one of seven high schools in the Garden Grove Unified School District. Los Amigos High School is located at the southeast corner of Newhope Street and Heil Ave and is one block east of Mile Square Park.

School history

Los Amigos High School first opened its doors to students in 1968. The first classes of 1968-69 were sophomores who had been freshmen at La Quinta High School (Westminster, California) and Santiago High School (Garden Grove, Ca)  New freshmen came from Fitz Intermediate School, as well as Peters Junior High School. There were only two classes (freshmen  as  sophomores) during that first school year.  As the years progressed, freshmen were added.  The second year (1969–70) had three classes—freshmen, sophomores, and juniors.  It would be the academic year 1970-71 before the school had all four classes—freshmen through seniors.  The first graduating class was 1971.  The class of 1971 and 1972 wrote both the fight song and the Alma Mater. Although the colors of the school, black and orange were assigned by the district, the Lobo Mascot was picked by the 2 classes as well. The class of 1972 collected enough money to paint Los Amigos High School and the school mascot, the Lobo (wolf), across the front of the gymnasium as shown in the photo above.  Hal Butler was the principal during these early years.

Conceived at a time when "open education" was the movement of the day in public education, Los Amigos was constructed in a rather unconventional manner for the warm climate of Southern California. Not only were both of the school's primary classroom buildings - the "L" and "M" buildings - built with interior corridors, all classrooms were built without doors. It would not be until the late 1990s before all classrooms at Los Amigos were provided with doors. Recently the school installed several new classrooms the "A","B","C" and "D" portables to accommodate the increasing number of freshmen each year. The school has now remodeled their "M" and "L" buildings with new modifications to the classrooms. The "L" building has been dubbed the 100 Building and the "M" building has been named the 200 building.

Since opening its doors in 1968, Los Amigos has been led by the following Principals:

1968 - ?:  Hal Butler,
1970s?:  Ken Calkins
199? - 1998:  George Wilson,
1998 - 2009:  Connie Van Luit,
2009 - 2014:  Robin Patterson
2014–2019: Vicky Braddock
2019–present: Amy Avina
Best High Schools- Silver Medal.

Academics

Los Amigos is a Title 1 School. Los Amigos' base Academic Performance Index (API) score for the 2007-2008 school year is 715.

In 2006, 436 Advanced Placement (AP) exams were taken at the school, and 23.1% of the 2006 graduating class passed at least one AP exam.

Student body
As of the 2012-2013 school year, 1,907 students attend Los Amigos High School. A culturally diverse community, Los Amigos High School has a student population that is 79.4% Hispanic, 15.2% Asian, 3.1% Caucasian, 0.7% African American, 0.2% Pacific Islander, 1.0% Filipino, and 0.1% American Indian. The vast majority of the Los Amigos student body is drawn from the communities of Fountain Valley and Santa Ana.

Student activities

Los Amigos offers many co-curricular and extracurricular programs for its students, including: Advancement Via Individual Determination (AVID), ASB/Leadership, Choral Music, Drama, Instrumental Music, Knowledge Bowl, Peer Court, and Visual Arts.

Some of the student clubs at Los Amigos include: Latinos Unidos, African-American Club, American-Cancer Society, Amnesty International, Anime Club, Video Game Club, Art Club, Asian Student Union (a division of VAHSA), Bowling Club, Career Explorers Club, Drama Club, European History Club, French Club, Impact Club, Junior Statesmen of America Club, Key Club, KIWIN'S, Model United Nations Club, Marine Biology Club, National Honor Society, Pink Ribbon Club, Red Cross Club, Rock-n-Roll Club, Science Olympiad, Surf Club, Tree Huggers Club, Human Relations Club, Boys League, Girls' League, and the Gay/Straight Alliance Club .

Some of the notable achievements of Los Amigos' co-curricular and extracurricular programs include:
 1990 - Paw Prints Newspaper won the $1000 first place prize in the first Los Angeles Times contest for Best Issue in O.C.
 1998 - "Every 15 minutes", a drinking and driving awareness program, sponsored by the Fountain Valley Police Department, is held every two years for juniors and seniors.
 2000 - 2nd-place finish in the Constitutional Rights Foundation's Mock Trial competition for Orange County high schools.
 2002 - The debate team competed in Atlanta, Georgia.
 2003 - Advancement Via Individual Determination (AVID), is offered on campus.
 2007 - Silver Medal Winner in the first annual Americas Best High School's in the Nation sponsored by U.S. News & World Report magazine, it placed Los Amigos in the top two percent of high schools nationally.
 2008 - 18 Advanced Placement classes currently being taught on campus.
 2008 - Silver Medal Winner in the second annual America's Best High School's in the Nation sponsored by U.S. News & World Report magazine
 2009 - Los Amigos High School Won $10,000 from SocialVibe for ranking #1 on their High Schoolers Gone Good contest.

Athletics

Los Amigos athletic teams are known as the Lobos, while the school itself is known as the Den of the Lobos. Los Amigos' athletic teams compete in the Garden Grove League.

State championships

 2019 - Girls Soccer CIF Champions
 2006 - Boys' Soccer CIF Champions
 1993 - Water Polo CIF Champions

Regional Occupation Program

Los Amigos offers Regional Occupation Program (ROP) courses in the following disciplines: Art of Animation, Automotive Careers, Business Applications, Computer Aided Drafting, Construction Technology, General Office Clerk, Restaurant Careers, and Software Specialist.

Notable alumni

 Mike Pompeo (Class of 1982) - 70th U.S. Secretary of State (2018–2021), 6th Director of the Central Intelligence Agency, (2017–2018), Member of the United States House of Representatives from Kansas's 4th congressional district (2011–2017)
 Don Hồ - Vietnamese American pop singer

References

External links
 Los Amigos High School Official Home Page

Educational institutions established in 1968
High schools in Orange County, California
1968 establishments in California
Public high schools in California